Rautela is an upper caste of   Hindu Rajputs from Garhwal and Kumaon divisions in the Indian state of Uttarakhand.

History 
In 1786, king Mohan Singh Rautela defeated king Prakram Shah and at the battle of Pali Gaon defeated Harsh Deo with the help of his brother Lal Singh Rautela.

References 

Rajput clans of Uttarakhand